Copycats is a children's game show which aired on CBBC and was presented by double act Sam & Mark (Sam Nixon and Mark Rhodes). It involved two teams of friends and family, each of six contestants, battling against each other in a series of games. Each episode consists of a number of rounds. Three of the rounds were based on chinese whispers. These alternate with physical challenges, which varied from episode to episode.

On 17 January 2016, Sam & Mark announced on their Twitter that Copycats would return after a three-year absence. The new series was filmed in March. The new series of "Copycats" had a brand new look with new opening titles, new logo, new games and new set.

Games

Chinese whispers-style rounds
These rounds form the general theme of Copycats.  Each team plays in turn.  The members of the team are each placed in cubicles separated by sliding doors. Each team member has just 10 seconds to copy the words on the card.  The rounds of this form are:
 Mime Time  An action, conveyed by miming. Examples are, "Flipping a pancake" or "Clipping Your Toenails".
 Quick on the Draw  An object, drawn rapidly on a whiteboard.
 Music Round  A musical piece, conveyed by performing it on a kazoo, or by mouthing the words clearly to the next team member.
In each case, the entity to be identified is given to the first member of the team, who must communicate it to the second by the given means, who must in turn communicate it to the third, and so on.  The last, sixth member is then asked what was being mimed, drawn or played.  If this player correctly identifies the action, object or tune that was originally supplied, the team scores 50 points.  Otherwise, the remaining players are asked in turn, with the available score decreasing by 10 for each player who fails to answer correctly.

The winner of the Mime Time and Quick on the Draw rounds (or if the game is a draw, the winner of a rock-paper-scissors game) chooses whether to play the physical challenge that follows or pass it to the other team.

Physical challenges

Transmissions

Series

Special

References

External links
 
 
 

2009 British television series debuts
2016 British television series endings
2000s British children's television series
2010s British children's television series
2000s British game shows
2010s British game shows
CBBC shows
BBC children's television shows
BBC television game shows
British children's game shows
British television series revived after cancellation
English-language television shows
Television series by BBC Studios